Tereza Nosková (born 3 April 1997) is a Czech luger. She competed in the women's singles event at the 2018 Winter Olympics.

References

1997 births
Living people
Czech female lugers
Olympic lugers of the Czech Republic
Lugers at the 2018 Winter Olympics
Sportspeople from Jablonec nad Nisou